Na Hom is the name of several places in Thailand and Laos.
Na Hom, village in Bolikhamsai Province, Laos
Na Hom, subdistrict in Thung Si Udom district, Thailand
Na Hom, village in Na Hom subdistrict of Thung Si Udom district, Thailand
Na Hom, village in Na Kham subdistrict of Kham Khuean Kaeo district, Thailand